The 1992 Argentina rugby union tour of Europe was a series of eight matches played by the Argentina national rugby union team in October and November 1992, in France, Spain and Romania. The renewed and young Argentinian team won all the test match.

Matches

In Spain 

 Madrid Combined XV: Guterrez (Turón); Leguey (Alvarez), Serres, García de la Torre, Revuelta (Peña); Nuñez, Hernandez Gil; Valeira (Duncan), Izquierdo, Monzón; I. Serván, J.Gutierrez; Mascaró, Cerrales, Aguiar.
Argentina: R. dela Arena; G. Jorge (M. Terán) P. Cremaschi, S. Salvat (F.J. Mendez), M Roby; L. Arbizu (capt.), R. Crexell; R. Perez, J. Santamarina, G. García; G. Llanes, P. Sporleder; O. Hassan, R. Le Fort, M. Corral.

In Romania 

Romania B : Mazilu; Olarescu, Draghia, Sava, Colceriu; Petre, Udroiu; Stefanescu, Oroian, Draguceanu; Branescu (Gunarescu), Caragia; Soare (Solojean), Negreci (Roddoi), Costea. Argentina: S.Mesón; R.de la Arena, L.Arbizu (capt.), P.Cremaschi, M.Roby; G.Camardón, F.Bullrich; D.García, J.Santamarina (N.Ferrari), F.Buabes; G.Llanes, R.Pérez; O.Hassan, R.Le Fort, M.Corral.

In France 

 Cote Basque XV: Lamaison; Berza, Pain, Vergniol, Hontas; Arrieta (Lescarboura), Accoceberry; Milheres, Goulomet (Ravier), Magnes; Braud, Sanoko; Salles, Gonzalez, Lascube. Argentina: S.Mesón; R.de la Arena, S.Salvat, L.Arbizu (capt.), M.Roby; G.Camardón, R.Crexell; .Irrazabal, N.Ferrari, G.García; G.Llanes, P.Sporleder; O.Hassan (E.Noriega), E.Garbarino, M.Corral. 

 Roussillon XV: Tresene; Arbo, Martín, Enrique (Gaullo) Amorós; Atty, Macabiau; Lieurmot, Delpoux, Beltrán (X.Tresene); Fourny, Mascardó (Aoutones); Laurente, Morizot, Amalric. Argentina: S.Mesón; D.Cuesta Silva, L.Arbizu (capt.), S.Salvat, M.Terán; G.Camardón, F.Bullrich; G.García, J.Santamarina, R.Perez; G.Llanes, P.Sporleder; F.Mendez, R.Le Fort, E.Noriega. 

 Limousin-Auvergne: Darlet (Branchet); Bertrand, Soubira, Nicol, Faugeron; Romeo, Rioux; Lhermet, Maisonnve, Van deslinden; Chamelot, Allegret; Crespy, Faure, Marocco. Argentina:S.Mesón; M.Terán, S.Salvat, D.Cuesta Silva,g.Jorge; L.Arbizu (capt.), Camardón; R.Pérez, J.Santamarina, F.Buabse; P.Sporleder, G.Llanes; O.Hassan, R.Le FOrt, F. Mendez.

References

Sources

Argentina national rugby union team tours
Rugby union tours of France
Rugby union tours of Spain
Rugby union tours of Romania
rugby
tour
Rugby union tour
Rugby union tour